The 2001 English cricket season was the 102nd in which the County Championship had been an official competition. Yorkshire won the County Championship for the first time since 1968. In limited overs cricket, a change of sponsor meant that the NatWest Trophy became the C&G Trophy. The Second XI Trophy was inaugurated as a limited overs knockout competition. Australia again won the Ashes, this time largely due to some fine performances by Adam Gilchrist. It was the 70th test series between the two sides with Australia winning 4-1. Pakistan also toured England with the series ending in a 1–1 draw.

Honours
County Championship - Yorkshire
C&G Trophy - Somerset
National League - Kent
Benson & Hedges Cup - Surrey
Minor Counties Championship - Cheshire, Lincolnshire (shared title)
MCCA Knockout Trophy - Norfolk
Second XI Championship - Hampshire II 
Second XI Trophy - Surrey II 
Wisden - Andy Flower, Adam Gilchrist, Jason Gillespie, V V S Laxman, Damien Martyn

Test Series

Ashes tour

Pakistan tour

County Championship

National League

C&G Trophy

Benson & Hedges Cup

Leading batsmen

Leading bowlers

References

External sources
 CricketArchive – season and tournament itineraries

Annual reviews
 Playfair Cricket Annual 2002
 Wisden Cricketers' Almanack 2002

 2001